Sunrise Distribution a.k.a. Sunrise Comics and Games was a Commerce, California-based comic book distributor which operated in the early-to-mid 1980s. Owned by Scott Mitchell Rosenberg, the company was intimately connected to a number of small comic book publishers from that era, including Eternity Comics and Malibu Comics, as well as three extremely short-lived publishers: Amazing, Imperial Comics, and Wonder Color.

History 
Sunrise Distribution evolved from Rosenberg's mail-order comics business, Direct Comics, which he had founded when he was 13 years old.

Publishing ventures

Eternity Comics 
In early 1986, income from Rosenberg's comics distribution business allowed him to privately finance Eternity Comics, originally based in New York City and helmed by Brian Marshall. Writer/editor David Campiti worked as a packager to supply content for Eternity.

Amazing and Wonder Color 
Beginning in the summer of 1986, after disputes arose between Marshall and Campiti, Rosenberg (along with fellow investors Paula Brown, Mitch Everitt, and Jules Zimmerman) provided capital for Campiti to form two new small publishers: Amazing and Wonder Color, with business offices for both publishers based in the same location in Long Beach, California. (Marshall, meanwhile, retained control of Eternity.)

Amazing and Wonder Color were affiliated with another publisher with which Campiti was involved: Pied Piper Comics. The plan was that Campiti would package comics for all three publishers through his studio Campiti and Associates, with Pied Piper handling "special projects such as posters and graphic novels; black-and-white [comics] were Amazing's domain, and Wonder Color would product strictly color comics."

Wonder Color's staff included investor Paula Brown as Publisher, editor-in-chief Campiti, and Consulting Editor Roger McKenzie. Writer David Lawrence edited a few titles.

Malibu Comics and Imperial Comics 
Near the end of 1986, Rosenberg and his investors financed two new publishers: Imperial Comics, based in Brooklyn, New York, and helmed by Marshall; and Malibu Comics, based in Calabasas, California, headed by Dave Olbrich (previously an employee of Sunrise Distribution) and cartoonist Tom Mason. John Arcudi served as an editor for Imperial Comics.

Mergers  
In the spring of 1987, Sunrise announced that due to cash flow issues, it would not be able to pay its client publishers until July. 

Concurrently, Rosenberg revealed his connection to Amazing, Eternity, Imperial, Malibu, and Wonder Color, and declared that he was assuming direct control of all five publishers. At this point, Rosenberg shut down Amazing, Imperial, and Wonder Color, while keeping Eternity Comics as a Malibu brand. Some Imperial titles moved to Malibu/Eternity; a few Amazing and Wonder Color titles were retained by Campiti and moved to Pied Piper Comics.

Sunrise Bankruptcy 
Sunrise went bankrupt and abruptly folded in the summer of 1988, during the "black-and-white implosion." This left a number of small publishers without the cash flow to continue, and they, too, went out of business. Two of Sunrise's clients, the West Coast publishers Blackthorne Publishing and Fantagraphics, sued the distributor, but ultimately, neither publisher was able to recoup its losses. 

Rosenberg continued with Malibu, which survived into the mid-1990s, with many ups and downs, before being acquired by Marvel Comics in 1994.

Analysis 
In 2015, Tom Mason, a co-founder of Malibu Comics, described Rosenberg's operations this way:

Publishers financed by Sunrise/Scott Mitchell Rosenberg

Amazing Comics titles
 Amazing Comics Premieres #1–5 (Feb.Aug. 1987) — showcase title; contributors include Roger McKenzie, Kevin VanHook, David Lawrence, Sam Kieth, Ron Lim, and David Campiti 
 Barney the Invisible Turtle #1 (1987) — by Rick Rodolfo
 Blip and C.C.A.D.S #1–2 (1987) 
 Daemon Mask #1 (1987) — by Stuart Hopen and Russ Martin
 Domino Chance: Roach Extraordinaire (1987) — by Kevin Lenagh
 Ex-Mutants: The Special Edition (Spring 1987) — reprinting the first issue as published by Eternity
 Ex-Mutants #2–5 (1987) — by David Lawrence and Ron Lim; moved to Pied Piper Comics
 The Gajit Gang #1 (1987)
 Jack Frost #1–2 (1987) — by Kevin VanHook
 Phigments  #1 (1987) — art by Evan Dorkin; later acquired by Pied Piper Comics
 Tales of the Sun Runners #3 (Feb. 1987) — by Roger McKenzie and Glen Johnson; acquired from Sirius Comics
 The Sun Runners Christmas Special #1 (Mar. 1987) — contributors include Roger McKenzie and Kelley Jones
 Wabbit Wampage #1 (1987) — by Stephen D. Sullivan; based on a board game he had earlier developed with Pacesetter Ltd

Wonder Color titles 
 G.I. R.A.M.B.O.T. #1 (Apr. 1987)
 Hero Alliance #1 (May 1987) — moved to Pied Piper Comics
 Power Factor #1 (May 1987) — moved to Pied Piper Comics
 Terraformers (2 issues, Apr.May 1987) — art by Kelley Jones

Imperial Comics titles 
 Battle to the Death #1 (1987) — moved to Eternity Comics
 Blackstar (2 issues, Dec. 1986Feb. 1987) — by Jenkins, Matthews, and Phred
 Dark Comics #1 (1987)
 Nazrat (4 issues, Nov. 1986Apr. 1987) — by Jerry Frazee; moved to Eternity Comics
 Probe (2 issues, Feb. 1987Apr. 1987) — by Frank Turner; moved to Eternity Comics

See also 
 Capital City Distribution
 Pacific Comics
 New Media/Irjax

References

Notes

Sources 
 

 
 
 
 
 

Comics industry
Defunct companies based in California
Defunct comics and manga publishing companies
1988 disestablishments in California